

fi
fiacitabine (INN)
fialuridine (INN)
fibracillin (INN)
fibrin, bovine (INN)
fibrin, human (INN)
fibrinogen (125 I) (INN)
FibriScint (Janssen Biotech)
fibrinolysin (human) (INN)
fidarestat (INN)
fidaxomicin (USAN, INN)
fidexaban (USAN)
figitumumab (USAN, INN)
filaminast (INN)
filenadol (INN)
filgrastim (INN)
filibuvir (USAN, INN)
filipin (INN)
fimasartan (INN)
Finacea (Bayer)
finasteride (INN)
fingolimod (USAN)
Fioricet (Actavis)
Fiorinal (Actavis)
fipexide (INN)
firategrast (USAN, INN)
firocoxib (USAN)
fispemifene (USAN)